Valmar may refer to:

People
 Valmar (born 1948), Armenian painter
 Siim Valmar Kiisler (born 1965), Estonian politician
 Valmar Adams (1899–1993), Estonian poet, literary scholar and editor
 Lilian Valmar (1928–2013), Argentine actress

Fiction
 Valmar, also spelled Valimar, capital of the land Valinor in J. R. R. Tolkien's legendarium
 Valmar, a character from the video game Grandia 2

See also
 Leopoldo Augusto de Cueto, 1st Marquis of Valmar (1815–1901), Spanish noble

Estonian masculine given names

es:Valmar
eu:Valmar
fr:Valmar
it:Valmar
nl:Valmar
pl:Aman (Śródziemie)#Valimar
pt:Valmar
zh:維利瑪